= Costumer =

Costumer may refer to:

- one that deals in or makes costumes
- a costume designer

== See also ==
- Customer
